Tollberg may refer to:

People with the surname
Brian Tollberg (born 1972), American professional baseball player
Maynard W. Tollberg (1904–1943), United States Navy sailor who received a posthumous Navy Cross for his actions during World War II

Ships
USS Tollberg (DE-593), a United States Navy destroyer escort converted during construction into the high-speed transport USS Tollberg (APD-103)
USS Tollberg (APD-103), a United States Navy high-speed transport in commission from 1945 to 1946